The 1991 Pepsi Cola Hotshots season was the second season of the franchise in the Philippine Basketball Association (PBA).

Occurrences
Pepsi Cola tendered an offer sheet to Purefoods forward Alvin Patrimonio, a five-year worth P25.3 million contract, which Purefoods expectedly matched, making Alvin Patrimonio the highest paid basketball player in the PBA.

Notable dates
March 21: Pepsi eked out a 131-129 win over Presto Tivoli which felt robbed of a strong chances in overtime when a referee's call decided the outcome of the game. Abet Guidaben sank two free throws with no time left on a foul slapped on Presto import Dwayne McClain. The Hotshots' win was their fourth in eight games as this was their first back-to-back victories in franchise history.   

July 9: Abet Guidaben's go-ahead basket with eight seconds to go lift Pepsi to a repeat 107-106 overtime win over Shell for only their second victory in eight games in the All-Filipino Conference. 

July 13: Pepsi stays alive in contention for a semifinal seat with a 99-88 win over Purefoods in Sta.Cruz, Laguna. The victory raised their record to three wins and six losses. 

October 3: Import Perry McDonald led Pepsi to their second straight victory after they lost their first two games in the Third Conference. The Hotshots fashioned out a 144-130 win over Swift Mighty Meaties. 
 
October 27: Pepsi Hotshots beats Shell Rimula-X, 117-107, at the close of the elimination round for the conference-best eight wins and three losses. The Hotshots ride high on a six-game winning streak, the longest in franchise' two-year history, Pepsi won eight of their last nine games since Perry McDonald arrived to replace Donald Petties.

Roster

Transactions

Trades

Additions

Recruited imports

References

TNT Tropang Giga seasons
Pepsi